Xinghua Subdistrict is a subdistrict of Changyi District, Jilin City, People's Republic of China. , it has six residential communities under its administration.

See also
List of township-level divisions of Jilin

References

Township-level divisions of Jilin